Statte railway station may refer to 
Statte (Italy) railway station in Italy
Statte railway station, Belgium in Belgium